Polston is a surname. Notable people with the surname include:

Polston as a Surname originated from Sussex in England and comes from the Old English Language meaning - 'By the Pool'.

Andy Polston (born 1970), English footballer
John Polston (born 1968), English footballer
Ricky Polston (born 1956), American judge

See also
Polsten, make of gun